Cashaw is a vernacular name for several plants. The term is derived from the colloquial English dialects, in particular Jamaican patois. It can refer to:

 Certain algarrobo, bayahonda and mesquite trees (Prosopis species) in the Fabaceae
 Anacardium occidentale, or cashew, in the Anacardiaceae
 Acacia farnesiana, or needle bush, in the Fabaceae
 Cucurbita argyrosperma, or cushaw, in the Cucurbitaceae